Haile Resorts is a hotel chain in Ethiopia owned by renowned athlete Haile Gebrselassie. Started operation in 2010 in Hawassa, the resort quickly evolved its destinations in 3 branches in Shashamene, Ziway and Arba Minch, continued expansion through Amhara Region, Addis Ababa and Oromia Region.

During Hachalu Hundessa riots on 30 June 2020, two hotels in Shashamene and Ziway were sacked and 400 staffs were out of work. Haile's recent Resort branch was opened in Welkite town in the Southern Nations, Nationalities, and People's Region in 2022.

History 
Athlete Haile Gebrselassie founded the resort in May 2010 based in Lake Hawassa about 250 miles south of Addis Ababa. Since then, the company has increased into 5 destination branches: Haile Hotel in Shashamene, Ziway Resort, Haile Arba Minch and Yaya Africa Athletics Village.

On the day of protest after the murder of Hachalu Hundessa on 30 June 2020, Haile claimed that his two hotels in Shashamene and Ziway were destroyed during this unrest, and 400 staffs were out of work. On 4 September 2020, Haile introduced the 7th Haile Resorts in Adama costing half billion birr. The new resort has 106 guest rooms, gymnasiums, swimming pools, dining and meeting halls. According to him, this resort has employed more than 300 people and would provide 4 to 5-star rating services. In February 2022, Haile embarked 5,352 square meters eleven hotels in Welkite town, which were completed on 18 September 2022. In the opening ceremony, Haile and the president of the Southern Nations, Nationalities, and People's Region inaugurated the completion of the project. The construction cost more than half billion birr, promoting the company to complete plans as possible.

List of resorts
 Haile Resorts Hawassa
 Ziway Resorts
 Haile Resorts Sululta
 Haile Resorts Shashemene
 Haile Resorts Arba Minch
 Haile Resorts Gondar
 Haile Resorts Adama
 Haile Grand Hotel Addis Ababa
 Haile Resorts Debre Birhan

References

Hotels in Ethiopia
Hotels in Addis Ababa